Natalie Davies (born 1 December 1966) is a British gymnast. She competed in six events at the 1984 Summer Olympics.

References

External links
 

1966 births
Living people
British female artistic gymnasts
Olympic gymnasts of Great Britain
Gymnasts at the 1984 Summer Olympics
People from Farnborough, London